Panetolikos Stadium ( Gipedo Panaitolikou) is a multi-use stadium in Agrinio, Aetolia-Acarnania, Greece.  It is currently used mostly for football matches and is the home stadium of Panetolikos. The stadium is located at Prousiotissis Street and it holds a capacity of 7,321 all-seated. Its highest attendance was 11,012 during a match against Olympiakos in 1977. There are plans to increase the seating capacity of the stadium to 11,000 in the future if necessary. Nowadays the average attendance is 5,000 (6,288 after expansion completion). Even though Agrinio is a small city, Panetolikos supporters known as "The Warriors" are well known for their loyalty for the team.

Info
The stadium has two stands along the sides of the pitch. It has been used as a football ground since 1930, however the first stand (the small east one) was not constructed until the mid-'50s. The main west stand was built in the 1970s. Unfortunately, in the years that followed, little else happened to the stadium, which gradually fell into disrepair. This was the situation until 2005, when the new owners of the club revealed their plans for the complete reconstruction of the stadium. The stadium features also team's offices, boutique and cafes.

Work has begun after the promotion of the team to the Superleague division, in order to increase the capacity of the stadium by 1400 seats approximately behind Prousiotissis Street goalpost (a Curva). Thus the Panetolikos' pitch will have three stands. Additional lighting and a scoreboard will be added over the next months. Recently the addition of extra lighting was complete, with the overall power of lights at 1600 lux, which satisfy the Greek Superleague and UEFA requirements. Additionally a scoreboard is added at 2017.

External links 
Photos at the Panetolikos website
Panaetolikos Stadium at stadia.gr

Football venues in Greece
Agrinio
Buildings and structures in Aetolia-Acarnania
Sports venues in Western Greece